The 2022 Tennis Napoli Cup was a professional men's tennis tournament played on outdoor hard courts. It was the 21st edition of the tournament, and part of the ATP Tour 250 series of the 2022 ATP Tour. It took place at the Tennis Club Napoli in Naples, Italy from 17 to 23 October 2022.

The tournament was upgraded from an ATP Challenger Tour event to an ATP Tour 250 event this year. It was one of the six tournaments that were given single-year ATP 250 licenses in September and October 2022 due to the cancellation of tournaments in China because of the ongoing COVID-19 pandemic.

Champions

Singles

  Lorenzo Musetti def.  Matteo Berrettini, 7–6(7–5), 6–2

Doubles

  Ivan Dodig /  Austin Krajicek def.  Matthew Ebden /  John Peers, 6–3, 1–6, [10–8]

Singles main-draw entrants

Seeds

 Rankings are as of 10 October 2022

Other entrants
The following players received wildcards into the singles main draw:
  Matteo Berrettini 
  Flavio Cobolli 
  Luca Nardi 

The following players received entry from the qualifying draw:
  Borna Gojo 
  Nicolás Jarry 
  Francesco Passaro 
  Zhang Zhizhen

Withdrawals
Before the tournament
  Alejandro Davidovich Fokina → replaced by  Bernabé Zapata Miralles
  Gaël Monfils → replaced by  Nuno Borges
  Brandon Nakashima → replaced by  Hugo Grenier
  Andrey Rublev → replaced by  Taro Daniel

Doubles main-draw entrants

Seeds

 Rankings are as of 10 October 2022

Other entrants
The following pairs received wildcards into the doubles main draw:
  Francesco Maestrelli /  Francesco Passaro 
  Stefano Napolitano /  Andrea Pellegrino

References

External links
 Official website 

2022 ATP Tour
Tennis Napoli Cup
2022 in Italian tennis
October 2022 sports events in Italy